Carlos Alberto (born 22 October 1980 in Boquim, Brazil), full name Carlos Alberto dos Santos Gomes, is a Brazilian footballer who plays for Boavista Sport Club at the left defender position.

External links
Profile at TFF.org

1980 births
Living people
Brazilian footballers
Brazilian expatriate footballers
Brazilian expatriate sportspeople in Turkey
Expatriate footballers in Turkey
Paysandu Sport Club players
Criciúma Esporte Clube players
Macaé Esporte Futebol Clube players
Denizlispor footballers
Süper Lig players
Sportspeople from Sergipe
Association football defenders